Microbulbifer agarilyticus is a bacterium from the genus of Microbulbifer which has been isolated from deep-sea sediments from the Sagami Bay in Japan.

References 

Alteromonadales
Bacteria described in 2008